ADW may refer to:

 Academy of Sciences of the German Democratic Republic (German: , AdW)
 Addiewell railway station, West Lothian, Scotland
 Advance-deposit wagering
 ADW.Launcher, an alternative home screen for the Android operating system
 Air Andaman, a defunct Thai airline
 Amondawa language
 Andrew Dickson White, diplomat, historian and first president of Cornell University
 Andrews Field, a military airfield in Maryland, United States
 Animal Diversity Web, a natural sciences database at the University of Michigan
 Archdiocese of Washington
 Assault with a deadly weapon, an abbreviation used in sentencing descriptions
 Atlanta Daily World, a newspaper
 Joint Base Andrews, the IATA code ADW